Bowery Farming is a  New York-based vertical farming and digital agriculture company with  farms in New Jersey, Maryland, and Pennsylvania. It grows and delivers pesticide-free lettuce, leafy greens, and herbs. The largest vertical farming operation in the United States, it serves major retailers at over 850 locations throughout the Northeast and Mid-Atlantic regions, including Whole Foods and Walmart, and supports local, fresh produce supply for a number of food-delivery companies.

History

Bowery Farming was founded in 2015 by entrepreneur Irving Fain, who earlier in his career co-founded CrowdTwist, acquired by Oracle Corporation for $100 million. Irving brought on entrepreneurs David Golden and Brian Falther as cofounders. Henry Sztul, joined shortly after as part of the founding team and led the development of the BoweryOS; he now serves as the company’s Chief Science Officer. The company raised a total of $472 million from Google Ventures, General Catalyst, GGV Capital and Temasek. Its latest round of funding in 2021 was led by Fidelity Investments. Investors in the company include Lewis Hamilton, Tom Colicchio, Chris Paul, José Andrés, Justin Timberlake, and Natalie Portman.

In 2021, Bowery opened Farm X, an innovation hub for plant science in Kearny, N.J., to grow crops beyond leafy greens and focusing on seed breeding specifically for indoor farming. The company added a third commercial smart farm in Bethlehem, Pennsylvania in 2021.

Bowery Farming operates three commercial farms and two R&D facilities in Kearny, NJ. It grows its produce inside industrial warehouses in New Jersey, Pennsylvania, and Maryland, using proprietary technology and vertical farming techniques, and without pesticides and minimal water footprint. Its locally grown products are delivered to Whole Foods Market, Giant Food, Walmart, Albertson's Companies (ACME and Safeway stores), and Weis Markets, among others. Bowery Farming also supports Hungryroot and Amazon delivery options.

Bowery Farming's technology relies on automation, sensors, robotics, AI and a proprietary operating system, BoweryOS, that takes photos of crops for and analyzes data in real time. The company hired  former Samsung Chief Technologist, Injong Rhee, to accelerate the integration of Bowery's proprietary technology across its network of vertical smart farms. In 2022, the company bought farming robotics firm, Traptic, especially for vine crops.

References

External links 

 Bowery Farming CEO Irving Fain on Cheddar TV
 Bowery Farming on CNBC TV
 Bowery Farming CEO on NPR Radio

American companies established in 2015
Transport companies established in 2015
Online food retailers of the United States
Experimental farms in the United States
Farms in New Jersey
Farms in Pennsylvania
Farms in New York City
2015 establishments in New York City
Agriculture companies established in 2015
Companies based in New York City
Research institutes in New York (state)